Emmeorhiza is a monotypic genus of flowering plants in the family Rubiaceae. The genus contains only one species, viz. Emmeorhiza umbellata, which is found from northern Trinidad to tropical South America.

References

External links
Emmeorhiza in the World Checklist of Rubiaceae

Monotypic Rubiaceae genera
Spermacoceae